Eduard Hämäläinen (born 21 January 1969 in Karaganda, Kazakh SSR, Soviet Union) is a retired decathlete from Finland and Belarus.

He originally competed for the Soviet Union and then Belarus after the Soviet dissolution, but changed nationality. His great-grandfather had moved from Finland to Russia before 1917 and was later deported to Kazakhstan. He was a frequent competitor in the European Athletics Championships, including the men's decathlon event in 1998. During his career he won three silver medals at World Championships.

Achievements

Personal bests

See also
List of nationality transfers in athletics

References

External links

1969 births
Living people
Sportspeople from Karaganda
Soviet decathletes
Finnish decathletes
Belarusian decathletes
Belarusian people of Finnish descent
Athletes (track and field) at the 1992 Summer Olympics
Athletes (track and field) at the 1996 Summer Olympics
Athletes (track and field) at the 2000 Summer Olympics
Olympic athletes of the Unified Team
Olympic athletes of Belarus
Olympic athletes of Finland
World Athletics Championships medalists
European Athletics Championships medalists
CIS Athletics Championships winners